Hilyard Robert Robinson (1899 – July 2, 1986), was a prominent African-American architect and engineer.

Biography
Hilyard Robinson was born in Washington, D.C., where his mother was a seamstress and his grandfather had a shoe-shining business. Robinson graduated from M Street High School and then studied at the Pennsylvania Museum and School of Industrial Arts (now University of the Arts, Philadelphia). During World War I Robinson served as a U.S. Army artillery officer where he spent time in Paris at the Armistice and observed the style of the buildings there. Upon his return to the United States, Robinson transferred to the University of Pennsylvania before eventually graduating from Columbia University in 1924 with a degree in architecture and working for several architectural firms and teaching at Howard University.

In 1931, after he married Helena Rooks and completed a master's degree at Columbia, the Robinsons went to Europe to study in Germany, where Robinson was influenced by the Bauhaus style, as well as Scandinavia, France and elsewhere. 

Robinson taught architecture at Howard University from the 1920s to 1960s, and he also designed many campus buildings. 

The U.S. Department of the Interior commissioned Robinson to build the Langston Terrace Dwellings  (1935–1938) for which he gained prominence, and Robinson also served as an architectural consultant to the government of Liberia. Robinson worked closely with other American architects such as Ralph A. Vaughn and Paul Williams. He had served as a mentor in 1945 to emerging architect Henry Clifford Boles.

Robinson died in 1986 at Howard University Medical Center in Washington, D.C..

Notable works
Aberdeen Gardens (Hampton, Virginia) (1934)
Langston Terrace Dwellings (1935–1938)
Parkland Homes at Willow Run Bomber Plant (1943)
Ralph Bunche House (Washington, D.C.) (1941)
Sharpe Field Airport (1941)
Arthur Capper/Carrollsburg (1958)
Multiple Howard University buildings (Cramton Hall, the Ira Aldridge Theater, the School of Engineering, the Home Economics Building (now School of Human Ecology), Locke Hall)

References

1899 births
1986 deaths
Architects from Washington, D.C.
University of Pennsylvania alumni
University of the Arts (Philadelphia) alumni
Columbia Graduate School of Architecture, Planning and Preservation alumni
African-American architects
Howard University faculty
United States Army personnel of World War I
United States Army officers
20th-century American architects
20th-century African-American artists